The 2. Amateurliga Bayern was a set of eleven regional leagues in Bavaria existing from 1951 to 1963 as the fourth tier of football in the state.

The leagues were disbanded in 1963, when the German football league system was reorganised with the introduction of the Bundesliga and replaced by the Landesligas.

Overview
The 2. Amateurligas were introduced in Bavaria in 1951 to replace the previously existing Kreisligas at this level. This step was taken after the introduction of the 2nd Oberliga Süd as the new second division in southern Germany in 1950 and the renaming of the Landesliga Bayern to Amateurliga Bayern in 1951. The Landesliga had, until 1950, been functioning as one of the regional second divisions below the Oberliga Süd, alongside the Landesliga Nordbaden, the Landesliga Hessen and the Landesliga Württemberg.

The 2. Amateurliga, as the fourth tier of the German league system, below the Amateurliga Bayern as the third, was sub-divided into seven regions, along the boundaries of the seven Regierungsbezirke, those regions being:
 Upper Bavaria - Oberbayern
 Lower Bavaria - Niederbayern
 Swabia - Schwaben
 Upper Palatinate - Oberpfalz
 Middle Franconia - Mittelfranken
 Lower Franconia - Unterfranken
 Upper Franconia - Oberfranken

Some of the seven regions of the 2. Amateurliga were in turn sub-divided into regional leagues, resulting in the existence of eleven leagues at this level:
 2. Amateurliga Oberbayern A
 2.  Amateurliga Oberbayern B
 2. Amateurliga Niederbayern
 2. Amateurliga Schwaben
 2. Amateurliga Oberpfalz
 2. Amateurliga Mittelfranken Nord
 2. Amateurliga Mittelfranken Süd
 2. Amateurliga Unterfranken West
 2. Amateurliga Unterfranken Ost
 2. Amateurliga Oberfranken West
 2. Amateurliga Oberfranken Ost

Within the four Regierungsbezirke who had two leagues, a championship was played to determine the local champions, but no overall 2. Amateurliga championship was held. Instead, the regional champions would play promotion rounds to determine the teams that would move up to the Amateurliga. The promotion rounds where sub-divided into northern and southern Bavaria. The champions of the three Franconian Regierungsbezirke would play in the northern group while the other four Regierungsbezirke would play in the southern one. Swabia had a special status within this system, being allowed to send both champions and runners-up to the promotion round. Originally, until 1957, the promotion rounds were held in two groups of six teams, playing a home-and-away round, with the top-two teams from each being promoted.

In 1953, the Amateurliga Bayern was split in itself in two regional divisions, north and south, resulting in two new leagues:
 Amateurliga Nordbayern - Northern Bavaria
 Amateurliga Südbayern - Southern Bavaria

This decision was made rather late, on 7 July 1953, after the promotion rounds had already been played, resulting in all twelve teams that had taken part being promoted.

The promotion system remained unchanged after this, two groups of six with the first two in each group still promoted. In 1955, three teams were promoted from the north because VfB Helmbrechts had been promoted to the 2nd Oberliga Süd, thereby providing an additional spot in the Amateurliga Nordbayern. An expansion of the Amateurliga Südbayern from 14 to 16 clubs in 1957 allowed four teams to be promoted from the south.

From 1957-58 onwards, the promotion system was changed. In the north, the three Regierungsbezirk champions were now directly promoted. In the south, the Oberbayern and Schwaben champions were directly promoted while the champions of Niederbayern and Oberpfalz played a decider for one more promotion spot.

In 1958, an additional spot was available because 1. FC Bamberg had been promoted to the second division, this was played out between the three runners-up. The same happened in 1959, when SpVgg Bayreuth moved up to the second division. In 1960, when Schwaben Augsburg was promoted to the 2nd Oberliga, the losing team of the Niederbayern versus Oberpfalz encounter was also promoted.

Disbanding of the 2. Amateurligas
In 1963, the German league system was changed drastically. The Fußball-Bundesliga replaced the previously existing five Oberligas as the highest league in the country. Below it, five Regionalligas were created as the new second divisions.

On 27 April 1963, it was decided to reorganise the Bavarian league system, too. The two Amateurligas in Bavaria were reduced to a single division again, like until 1953. The 2nd Amateurligas were completely disbanded and replaced by three Landesligas as the new fourth tier, those being:
 Landesliga Bayern-Süd - covering Swabia and Upper Bavaria
 Landesliga Bayern-Mitte - covering Middle Franconia, Lower Bavaria and Upper Palatinate
 Landesliga Bayern-Nord - covering Lower and Upper Franconia

Apart from the ten clubs each that came from the two Amateurligas to the new Landesligas, the top-teams of the 2. Amateurligas in 1962-63 were also allowed to join the new leagues:

 From the 2. Amateurliga Schwaben
 SV Mering
 TSG Augsburg
 FC Memmingen
 TSV Kriegshaber
 BC Aichach
 From the 2. Amateurliga Oberbayern
 TSV 1860 Rosenheim
 FC Deisenhofen
 FSV Pfaffenhofen
 ASV Dachau
 Sportfreunde Pasing
 From the 2. Amateurliga Niederbayern
 SV Saal
 FC Dingolfing
 SpVgg Deggendorf
 From the 2. Amateurliga Oberpfalz
 TuS Rosenberg
 FC Maxhütte-Haidhof
 FC Schwarzenfeld

 From the 2. Amateurliga Mittelfranken
 TV Erlangen
 FC Hersbruck
 SpVgg Erlangen
 1. FC Nuremberg II
 FC Stein
 ASV Neumarkt
 From the 2. Amateurliga Oberfranken
 SC Sylvia Ebersdorf
 ASV Gaustadt
 VfB Bayreuth
 VfB Arzberg
 SpVgg Hof
 From the 2. Amateurliga Unterfranken
 SV Großwallstadt
 TSV Lohr
 Frankonia Mechenhard
 Bayern Kitzingen
 Post SV Würzburg
 FC Schweinfurt 05 II

All other clubs from the former 2. Amateurligas went to the Bezirksligas, which had existed since 1957, the fifth tier of league football.

League champions
The champions of the eleven 2. Amateurligas in Bavaria were:

Southern Bavaria

Northern Bavaria

 Promoted teams in Bold.
 In 1953, FC Memmingen, runners-up in Schwaben, was also promoted.
 In 1957, TSV Gersthofen, runners-up in Schwaben, was also promoted.

References

Sources
 Die Bayernliga 1945 - 1997  published by the DSFS, 1998.
 Deutschlands Fussball in Zahlen  An annual publication with tables and results from the Bundesliga to Verbandsliga/Landesliga, publisher: DSFS
 Kicker Almanach  The Football Yearbook on German football from Bundesliga to Oberliga, since 1937, published by the Kicker Sports Magazine
 50 Jahre Bayerischer Fussball-Verband  50th Anniversary book of the Bavarian FA

External links 
 Bayrischer Fussball Bund (Bavarian FA)
 Das deutsche Fussball Archiv 
  Bavarian League tables and results
 Private website with tables and results from Oberliga to Bezirksliga

4
1963 disestablishments in Germany
1951 establishments in West Germany
Sports leagues established in 1951
Ger